Mkushi is a town in the Central Province of Zambia, located on the Great North Road and the Tazara railway, northeast of Kapiri Mposhi.  The Changwena Falls and Fort Elwes (built-in 1896 by European gold prospectors) lie nearby.  Mkushi is well known within Zambia for its commercial farms and is where Chengelo School is situated. An outbreak of fall armyworms started in Mkushi on January 6, 2022.

See also 

 Railway stations in Zambia
 Railway stations in Tanzania

References 

Populated places in Central Province, Zambia